Thysanactis dentex, the Broomfin dragonfish, is a species of barbeled dragonfish found in the ocean depths from .  This species grows to a length of  SL.  This species is the only known member of its genus.

References
 

Stomiidae
Taxa named by Charles Tate Regan
Taxa named by Ethelwynn Trewavas
Fish described in 1930